The Dover to Clarksville Road-Hickeytown Road Segment is a historic road section southeast of Lamar, Arkansas. It consists of a  gravel section of Old Hickeytown Road, beginning at its junction with County Road 2651. The western portion of the road, while paved, exhibits similar characteristics. The road's date of construction is not known, but it likely dates to the 1830s or early 1840s, based on its design. It was probably used by a party of Cherokee in 1834, during the Trail of Tears forced migration.

The road section was listed on the National Register of Historic Places in 2005.

See also
National Register of Historic Places listings in Johnson County, Arkansas

References

Roads on the National Register of Historic Places in Arkansas
National Register of Historic Places in Johnson County, Arkansas
Transportation in Johnson County, Arkansas